"University Times" may refer to:

University Times, the faculty and staff newspaper of the University of Pittsburgh, Pittsburgh, Pennsylvania, USA.
The University Times, the student newspaper of Trinity College, Dublin, Ireland.